Anton Kostadinov (born 24 June 1982) is a Bulgarian footballer currently playing as a midfielder for Belasitsa Petrich.

Honours

Club
Levski Sofia
 Bulgarian Cup: 2002–03

References

External links
 Anton Kostadinov at footmercato 
 Profile at LevskiSofia.info

Bulgarian footballers
1982 births
Living people
First Professional Football League (Bulgaria) players
Second Professional Football League (Bulgaria) players
OFC Pirin Blagoevgrad players
PFC Levski Sofia players
PFC Pirin Blagoevgrad players
PFC Lokomotiv Mezdra players
PFC Spartak Varna players
OFC Vihren Sandanski players
PFC Svetkavitsa players
FC Montana players
PFC Belasitsa Petrich players
Association football midfielders
Sportspeople from Blagoevgrad